The Confirmation of Ferdinand E. Marcos as the third Prime Minister of the Philippines took place on June 12, 1978 at the Batasang Pambansa Complex in Quezon City. The confirmation by the Interim Batasang Pambansa marked the commencement of the first term of President Ferdinand Marcos as Prime Minister. 

Presidency of Ferdinand Marcos
Marcos, Ferdinand
1978 in the Philippines